James Hoste (1705 1744) ), of Sandringham, Norfolk was a British landowner and Whig politician who sat in the House of Commons from 1728 to 1734.
 
Hoste was baptized on 15 October 1705, the son of James Hoste and his second wife Anne Bresley. His father's first wife, Elizabeth Walpole, was the aunt of Sir Robert Walpole. Hoste was descended from Jacques Hooste of Middleburgh, Zealand, who fled to England in 1569. He was admitted at Corpus Christi College, Cambridge in 1722.   He married Susan Hammond, daughter of Anthony Hammond of South Wootton, Norfolk.
 
Hoste was put forwards as candidate for Bramber on the Gough interest at a by-election on 2 March 1728. There were irregularities in the poll and the matter came to the House of Commons. William Pulteney the brother-in-law of John Gumley, Hoste's opponent, caused a furore by pointing out indirectly that Hoste, was a relation of Robert Walpole. Hoste was seated on petition on 4 April 1728 and voted with the Government in every recorded division. He did not stand at the 1734 British general election.
 
Hoste died on 20 August 1744 leaving a daughter.

References

1705 births
1744 deaths
Members of the Parliament of Great Britain for English constituencies
British MPs 1727–1734